Boca Grande Taqueria is a chain of Mexican restaurants in the Boston, Massachusetts area.

Overview
Boca Grande's fare includes burritos, quesadilla, tacos and enchiladas. They also provide catering services. The name "Boca Grande" in Spanish literally means "Big Mouth".

History
Boca Grande was founded in 1986 by Mariko Kamio.  The restaurant was modeled on Gordo's Taqueria, a successful San Francisco restaurant owned by Kamio's cousin.  Mariko's brother, Michael Kamio, briefly joined the restaurant before founding his own chain of restaurants, Anna's Taqueria.

Competition
Boca Grande is attempting to compete with other Boston-area taquerias such as Anna's Taqueria, Felipe's, Baja Betty's, Picante, and El Pelón, as well as national chains including Qdoba Mexican Grill and Chipotle Mexican Grill.

See also
 List of Mexican restaurants

References

External links
Boca Grande Taqueria
A spice of sibling rivalry

Mexican restaurants in the United States
Restaurants in Boston
Restaurants established in 1986
1986 establishments in Massachusetts